Guidantonio da Montefeltro (1377 – February 1443) was count of Urbino in Italy from 1403 until his death.

In 1403, at the death of his father Antonio, Guidantonio inherited the family lands in the region of Italy called the Marche. Later he abandoned the Papal suzerainty and allied with King Ladislaus of Naples, who made him Gran conestabile of the Kingdom of Naples in 1411. Excommunicated by Pope Gregory XII, he took advantage of that move to conquer Assisi. He also controlled Castello, Cagli, Forlì, and Forlimpopoli.

Guidantonio later reconciled with Pope Martin V and with his enemy, the condottiero Braccio da Montone. In 1427 he occupied Urbania.

He died in 1443, his son Oddantonio succeeding him in Urbino.

Family and children
He married Ringarda Malatesta in 1397, but the two had no children. Guidantonio remarried with Caterina Colonna, who bore him 9 children. Apart from Oddantonio, his most famous son was the legitimated Federico, who was Duke of Urbino, as well as a condottiero and one of the most famous patron of arts in the Italian Renaissance. His daughter Sveva (1434–1478) married Alessandro Sforza, lord of Pesaro.

References

Sources

1377 births
1443 deaths
Counts of Urbino
15th-century condottieri
People temporarily excommunicated by the Catholic Church
Guidantonio